The Permanent Revolution and Results and Prospects is a 1930 book published by Bolshevik-Soviet politician and former head of The Red Army Leon Trotsky. It was first published by the Left Opposition in the Russian language in Germany in 1930. The book was translated into English by John G. Wright and published by New Park Publications in 1931.

Synopsis

"The Permanent Revolution"
"The Permanent Revolution" is a 1928 essay written by Leon Trotsky in response to criticism given by Soviet politician Karl Radek. The work was published in Russian by The Left Opposition after the expulsion of Trotsky from The Communist Party of the Soviet Union in 1927. It is a political theory book by Trotsky. Its title is the name of the concept of permanent revolution advocated by Trotsky and Trotskyists in opposition to the concept of socialism in one country as advocated by Joseph Stalin and Stalinists. 

This was published after the death of Vladimir Lenin which triggered a power struggle within military, bureaucratic, legislative bodies within the Communist Party of the Soviet Union. General Secretary Joseph Stalin formed a political alliance with Lev Kamenev, Zinnoviev and Nikolai Bukharin, who opposed Trotsky within The Politburo and The Central Committee. Stalin's bloc pursued an isolationist policy referred to as Socialism in One Country, which emphasized placing economic development before world revolution. Trotsky in contrast, saw this as a revisionist deviation from Marxism and Leninism, and in contrast proclaimed the Marxist ideology strategy of permanent revolution.

"Results and Prospects"
Results and Prospects is a 1908 essay written by Trotsky as a reaction to the 1905 Russian Revolution.

See also
 Leon Trotsky bibliography

References

Books about the Soviet Union
Books about the Russian Revolution
1919 non-fiction books
Russian books
Books about Trotskyism
Works by Leon Trotsky